Gleidson Ricardo Brito de Souza (born April 17, 1984 in Sobradinho, Bahia), known as Gleidson Souza or simply Gleidson, is a Brazilian footballer who plays for Rio Preto as left back.

Career statistics

References

External links

1984 births
Living people
Brazilian footballers
Association football defenders
Campeonato Brasileiro Série B players
Campeonato Brasileiro Série C players
Associação Desportiva São Caetano players
Clube de Regatas Brasil players
ABC Futebol Clube players